= Dol:Men X =

Japanese manga series

- First volume cover

ドルメンX (Dorumen X)
- Genre: Comedy
- Manga
- Written by: Yuna Takagi
- Published by: Shogakukan
- Imprint: Big Comics
- Magazine: Hibana
- Original run: March 6, 2015 – April 7, 2017
- Volumes: 4
- Television drama
- Directed by: Naoko Komuro
- Produced by: Mami Fujimori; Norihiko Nishi; Hiroe Suzuma; Tetsuya Sakashita
- Written by: Shōgō Kashida
- Music by: Tarō Makido
- Original network: Nippon TV
- Original run: March 10, 2018 – March 31, 2018
- Episodes: 4
- Live-action film
- Directed by: Naoko Komuro
- Produced by: Mami Fujimori; Norihiko Nishi; Hiroe Suzuma; Tetsuya Sakashita
- Written by: Shōgō Kashida
- Music by: Tarō Makido
- Studio: KATSU-do
- Released: June 15, 2018
- Runtime: 108 minutes

Dol:Men X (Japanese: ドルメンX, Hepburn: Dorumen X) is a Japanese manga series written and illustrated by Yuna Takagi. It was serialized in Shogakukan's seinen manga magazine Hibana from March 2015 to April 2017, with its chapters collected in four tankōbon volumes. It was adapted into a Japanese television drama broadcast on Nippon TV in March 2018, followed by a live-action film that premiered in June of the same year.

== Media ==
=== Manga ===
Written and illustrated by Yuna Takagi, Dol:Men X was serialized in Shogakukan's seinen manga magazine Hibana from March 6, 2015, to April 7, 2017. Shogakukan collected its chapters in four tankōbon volumes, released from March 11, 2016, to July 12, 2017.

==== Volumes ====
No.	Release date	ISBN
1	March 11, 2016	978-4-09-187496-2
2	March 11, 2016	978-4-09-187497-9
3	June 10, 2016	978-4-09-187703-1
4	July 12, 2017	978-4-09-189660-5

=== Drama ===
A 4-episode Japanese television drama adaptation was broadcast on Nippon TV from March 4 to March 31, 2018.

=== Live-action film ===
A live-action film featuring the same cast and staff of the TV drama premiered on June 15, 2018. The film recounted the TV drama's story with new scenes set 15 years later.

== Reception ==
Dol:Men X was one of the Jury Recommended Works at the 20th Japan Media Arts Festival in 2017.
